Everal Walsh is a British actor, known for his voice over roles in video games, such as The Witcher and Sacred 3.

Early life
He trained at the Academy Drama School, where he was the recipient of the Stage Scholarship.

Career
His roles on television include Wayne in The Street, Raymond the Bastard in Max and Paddy's Road to Nowhere and Cecil in Prime Suspect 5. He has also appeared in Coronation Street, Emmerdale and Doctor Who.

In 2011, he played his first major role in the feature film Screwed, directed by Reg Traviss, playing the part of Curtis Nelson. The film, released nationally by Lionsgate Films in June 2011, was based on the 2008 book Screwed: The Truth About Life as a Prison Officer written by the pseudonymous Ronnie Thompson.

His theatre work includes productions at the West Yorkshire Playhouse, the Nottingham Playhouse and the Royal Exchange Theatre, Manchester.

Walsh works as a voice actor and has appeared in a number of radio productions for BBC Radio 4. He has also provided voiceovers for several video games.

Filmography

Video games

References

External links
 

Living people
British male television actors
Alumni of the Academy Drama School
Place of birth missing (living people)
Black British male actors
British male stage actors
Year of birth missing (living people)